Malviya Nagar is the name of a number of residential colonies mainly in some metro cities India:

Malviya Nagar (bathinda)
Malviya Nagar (Allahabad)
Malviya Nagar (Delhi)
Malviya Nagar (Bhopal)
Malviya Nagar (Indore)
Malviya Nagar (Lucknow)
Malviya Nagar (Jaipur)